Sipsa is a moth genus in the subfamily Autostichinae. It contains the species Sipsa tritoma, which is found in New Guinea.

References

Autostichinae
Moths described in 1955